Zilzie is a coastal locality in the Livingstone Shire, Queensland, Australia.

Geography 

History 
Zilzie was named for Zilzie Point, the coastal northern end of the suburb, which was named after a property in the area which was owned by Arthur Bootle Wilbraham, who made an anagram of Lizzie (née Jardine), the name of his wife.

Between 2008 and 2013, Zilzie and the rest of the Shire of Livingstone were part of the Rockhampton Region.

Population
 2006: 1153
 2011: 1890
 2016: 2713

Facilities 
Emu Park-Zilzie Sewage Treatment Plant is at 3620 Emu Park Road.

References

Towns in Queensland
Coastal towns in Queensland
Shire of Livingstone
Localities in Queensland